Harcourt Templeman was a British screenwriter, film producer and director.

Selected filmography
Director
 There's Many a Slip (1925)
 A Medical Mystery (1925)
 The Bells (1931)
 Money Means Nothing (1932)

Producer
 Hyde Park Corner (1935)
 The Gay Adventure (1936)
 Midnight Menace (1937)
 Take a Chance (1937)
 Command Performance (1937)
 Follow Your Star (1938)

References

External links

Year of birth unknown
Year of death unknown
British screenwriters
British film directors
British film producers